George Willard Martin (October 27, 1886 – September 11, 1971) was an American mycologist. He was born in Brooklyn, New York. He received a bachelor of literature degree in 1912, and a Master of Science degree in 1915, both from Rutgers University. He received a PhD from the University of Chicago in 1922, under the direction of  Thurlow Christian Nelson and Henry Chandler Cowles, and he published the results of his research in the Botanical Gazette in 1923 under the title "Food of the Oysters". Afterward, he began work at the University of Iowa, where he became a professor, and he was head of the Department of Botany from 1953 to 1955. He became an emeritus professor and was still an active researcher until after he turned 80. Martin was the associate editor for mycology for the journal The American Midland Naturalist.

References

1886 births
1971 deaths
American mycologists
People from Brooklyn
Rutgers University alumni
University of Chicago alumni
University of Iowa faculty
Scientists from New York (state)